Zayets is a surname. Notable people with the surname include:

Oleksandr Zayets (1962–2007), Ukrainian football player
Serhiy Zayets (born 1969), Ukrainian football player and manager
Serhiy Zayets (footballer, born 2001) (born 2001), Ukrainian football player
Vladimir Zayets (born 1981), Azerbaijani athlete

See also
 

Ukrainian-language surnames